Mary Patricia Cunniff Collins (June 1920–November 5, 2010) is an American who was the First Lady of Boston from 1960 until 1968 during the mayoral tenure of her husband John F. Collins. Collins was considered an active municipal first lady. Collins' activities during her husband's mayoralty included serving a chairwoman of March of Dimes and on the boards of Faulkner Hospital and Boston's Museum of Fine Arts. Collins was also regarded as a key figure in her husband's political campaigns.

Early life
Collins was born Mary Patricia Cunniff in June 1920 in the Roxbury neighborhood of Boston, Massachusetts. Before her birth, Collins' parents had immigrated to the United States from County Galway, Ireland and settled in Roxbury.

Collins graduated from St. Joseph's Academy, located in the Roxbury neighborhood.

After training to become a legal secretary, Collins worked as a legal secretary at the Suffolk Superior Court in Boston in the 1940s. In her work, she met John F. Collins, who was working as a lawyer. After John F. Collins'  service in as a military intelligence officer in World War II, the two married in 1946. They settled in the Jamaica Plain neighborhood of Boston, where they lived for three decades. Together they had four children: sons John F. Collins. Jr and Thomas F. Collins and daughters Margaret A. Collins and Mary Patricia Potter.

Collins' husband entered politics, being elected to the Massachusetts House of Representatives in 1947. He would also serve as a Massachusetts state senator and a Boston City Councilor before his election as mayor of Boston. During her husband's political campaigns, Collins involved herself in his debate preparations by asking him practice questions and assisting him in refining his answers. Collins' husband had his legs paralyzed in 1955 after contracting polio. His bout with polio took place during his campaign for election to the Boston City Council. During her husband's hospitalization, Collins ran his campaign as a co-manager, working from their personal residence in the Jamaica Plain neighborhood of Boston. Collins would act as a campaign surrogate for her husband in the multiple political campaigns he ran after his partial paralysis.

First Lady of Boston

Collins' husband was elected mayor of Boston in 1959. Collins is considered to have been a primary player in the success of her husband's candidacy. Her husband served as mayor from 1960 until 1968, being reelected in 1963.

During her husband's mayoralty, Collins was an active municipal first lady.

Collins served for a time as a chairwoman of March of Dimes a nonprofit organization which raised funds for polio treatment and research.

Collins served on the boards of several institutions, including Faulkner Hospital and Boston's Museum of Fine Arts.

During his mayoralty, Collins' husband unsuccessfully ran in the 1966 United States Senate election in Massachusetts. Collins played an active role in her husband's United States Senate campaign.

Later life
In the 1990s, Collins and her husband moved to Falmouth, Massachusetts. Collins would live there for the next 15 years.  She served on the boards of several local nonprofits in Falmouth. Her husband died in 1995, leaving Collins a widow.

Collins died from a heart attack at the age of 90 on November 5, 2010 at the Atria Woodbriar Living Group assisted living facility in Falmouth. After her death, Raymond Flynn, a one-time mayor of Boston, remarked that Collins, "was a wonderful mother, wife, friend and great first lady of Boston. She and Mayor Collins represented all that was special about Boston." She was interred alongside her late husband at St. Joseph Cemetery in West Roxbury, Massachusetts.

References

1920 births
2010 deaths
People from Falmouth, Massachusetts
People from Jamaica Plain
People from Roxbury, Boston
Spouses of Massachusetts politicians